Alexander Pollock Stitt Gibson (28 November 1939 – 22 November 2003) was a Scottish professional footballer who played as a central defender.

Career
Born in Kirkconnel, Gibson played for Auchinleck Talbot, Notts County and Boston United.

References

1939 births
2003 deaths
Scottish footballers
Auchinleck Talbot F.C. players
Notts County F.C. players
Boston United F.C. players
English Football League players
Association football defenders